General Salif Traoré is a Malian politician. He graduated from the École spéciale militaire de Saint-Cyr. He has served as the Malian Minister of Security & Civilian Protection since September 2015. He believes in combatting terrorism by collecting better intelligence.

References

Living people
École Spéciale Militaire de Saint-Cyr alumni
Government ministers of Mali
Year of birth missing (living people)
21st-century Malian people